Breakspeare (alternatively Breakspear) is a surname. It may refer to:

Breakspeare
Boso Breakspeare (died 1178), Italian Cardinal
Cindy Breakspeare (born 1954), Jamaican jazz musician and former model
William Breakspeare (1855–1914), English artist

Breakspear
Breakspear, pen name of William Lysander Adams (1821–1906), American writer and newspaper editor in Oregon, later a doctor
Nicholas Breakspear, birth name of Pope Adrian IV, the only English Pope

See also
Nicholas Breakspear School, English secondary school with academy status situated near St Albans